The Northcutts Cove Chapel in Altamont, Grundy County, Tennessee, is one of the oldest chapels of the Church of Jesus Christ of Latter-day Saints in the southeastern United States.

The chapel was dedicated in 1909 by Charles A. Callis who was then, president of the Southern States Mission of the LDS.

The building is a wooden-frame structure with a bell tower and spire. It was listed on the National Register of Historic Places in 1979.

Sources

20th-century Latter Day Saint church buildings
Buildings and structures in Grundy County, Tennessee
Meetinghouses of the Church of Jesus Christ of Latter-day Saints in the United States
Properties of religious function on the National Register of Historic Places in Tennessee
Churches completed in 1909
Latter Day Saint movement in Tennessee
Religious buildings and structures in Tennessee
National Register of Historic Places in Grundy County, Tennessee